Newenden is a small village and civil parish in area and population in the Ashford District of Kent, England.

Geography
The village is clustered together along the south slope and at the foot of the end of a tall escarpment by the River Rother, six miles (6.4 km) south-west of Tenterden on the A28. Newenden is located immediately north of the Rother which forms the county boundary with East Sussex. The humpback bridge of 1736 has recently been repaired.  As the land at the very edge of the parish and lowest points is marshy, the narrow hill escarpment itself is known locally as Frogs Hill.

History
Lossenham Friary was established northeast of the village in around 1242 but it was burnt down in 1275 and no remains are visible.

In March 1300, wardrobe accounts of King Edward I of England include a reference to a game called "creag" being played at Newenden by Prince Edward, then aged 15. It has been suggested that creag was an early form of cricket.

Amenities
The ancient parish church is dedicated to Saint Peter; it was restored in 1859.  A large pub is marked in maps next to the river.

References

External links

 Newenden website
 Newenden village
 Statistical civil parish overview - map

Civil parishes in Ashford, Kent
Cricket in Kent
English cricket in the 14th to 17th centuries
Villages in Kent
Villages in the Borough of Ashford